Wilton Center is a neighborhood/section and census-designated place (CDP) in the town of Wilton in Fairfield County, Connecticut, United States. As of the 2010 census it had a population of 732. The CDP partially overlaps the Wilton Center Historic District.

Geography 
The CDP extends from Ridgefield Road (Connecticut Route 33) in the north to Wolfpit Road Connecticut Route 106 in the south, and is bordered to the east by the Metro-North Railroad Danbury Branch line. The historic district is largely along Ridgefield Road at the north end of the CDP. The Norwalk River flows from north to south through the eastern side of the CDP.

References 

Census-designated places in Fairfield County, Connecticut
Census-designated places in Connecticut